Clive Delaney (born 2 January 1980 in Dublin) is an Irish footballer who plays in Sydney, Australia as a defender for amateur side Dunbar Rovers FC.

He signed for Derry for the second time in February 2008, having formerly played for the club between 2004 and 2006. He formerly played for West Ham United, UCD, St Patrick's Athletic and Bray Wanderers.

Played for Pats in the 2003 FAI Cup Final and scored in the 2006 Final . Captained the Derry City side in 2008 to League Cup success.

Represented his country at the UEFA U-19 Championship in Sweden in 1999 where he scored the winning goal as Ireland defeated Greece to win the bronze medal.
Signed for West Ham United in 2002/2003 where he became a regular in the Reserve side under Roger Cross. He had successful trials at QPR and Sunderland in pre-season 2003/2004, however he chose to return to Ireland to finish his Chartered Accounting qualification and play semi-professional football with St Patrick's Athletic in Dublin.

His uncle Leo O'Reilly won League of Ireland championships with Shamrock Rovers and Dundalk F.C. in the 1950s and 1960s.

Honours
  FAI Cup
 Derry City - 2006
  FAI League Cup: 3
 Derry City - 2005, 2006, 2008

References

External links

1980 births
Living people
Republic of Ireland association footballers
League of Ireland players
University College Dublin A.F.C. players
St Patrick's Athletic F.C. players
Derry City F.C. players
Bray Wanderers F.C. players
Republic of Ireland under-21 international footballers
Republic of Ireland youth international footballers
Association football defenders